The Avignon Punic inscription is a Punic language inscription found in the Champfleury area of  Quartier Ouest of Avignon in 1897, by a builder digging a trench 2-3 meters deep on the boundary of a property. It was first announced by Mayer Lambert.

It is currently held at the Musée d'archéologie méditerranéenne in Marseilles. It is known as KAI 70 and RES 360

It is considered to originate from Carthage.

Inscription

{|
|+ 
|-
| (1) || QBR ZYBQT HKHN[T L]RBT ... BT|| (This is the) grave of ZYBQT, the pries[tess of (the)] Lady... daughter of
|-
| (2) || ʿBDʾŠMN BN BʿLYTN BN ʿBDʾŠMN ʾŠT  ||  'Abd-Eshmun, son of Baalyaton, son of 'Abd-Eshmun; wife of
|-
| (3) || BʿLḤNʾ MQM ʾL[M BN] ʿBDMLQRT BN || Baalhanno, (the) servant (of the) go[ds, son of] 'Abd-Melqart, son of
|-
| (4) || ḤMLKT BN ʿBDʾŠMN ʾBL LPTḤ || Himilco, son of 'Abd-Eshmun. Do not open this.
|}

Gallery

Bibliography
 Berger Philippe. Annonce de la découverte d'une inscription phénicienne à Avignon. In: Comptes rendus des séances de l'Académie des Inscriptions et Belles-Lettres, 41e année, N. 6, 1897. p. 672. DOI : https://doi.org/10.3406/crai.1897.71073
 Clerc Michel. Note sur l'inscription phénicienne d'Avignon. In: Comptes rendus des séances de l'Académie des Inscriptions et Belles-Lettres, 42e année, N. 3, 1898. pp. 446-452. DOI : https://doi.org/10.3406/crai.1898.71205

References

External links
 NOUVEAU PARCOURS ARCHÉOLOGIQUE EN MÉDITERRANÉE

Punic inscriptions
Archaeological discoveries in France
1897 archaeological discoveries
Avignon
Archaeological artifacts
Phoenician steles